In mathematics, an infinite periodic continued fraction is a continued fraction that can be placed in the form

where the initial block of k + 1 partial denominators is followed by a block [ak+1, ak+2,...ak+m] of partial denominators that repeats ad infinitum. For example,  can be expanded to a periodic continued fraction, namely as [1,2,2,2,...].

The partial denominators {ai} can in general be any real or complex numbers. That general case is treated in the article convergence problem. The remainder of this article is devoted to the subject of simple continued fractions that are also periodic. In other words, the remainder of this article assumes that all the partial denominators ai (i ≥ 1) are positive integers.

Purely periodic and periodic fractions

Since all the partial numerators in a regular continued fraction are equal to unity we can adopt a shorthand notation in which the continued fraction shown above is written as

where, in the second line, a vinculum marks the repeating block. Some textbooks use the notation

where the repeating block is indicated by dots over its first and last terms.

If the initial non-repeating block is not present – that is, if k = -1, a0 = am and

the regular continued fraction x is said to be purely periodic. For example, the regular continued fraction for the golden ratio φ – given by [1; 1, 1, 1, ...] – is purely periodic, while the regular continued fraction for the square root of two – [1; 2, 2, 2, ...] – is periodic, but not purely periodic.

As unimodular matrices
Such periodic fractions are in one-to-one correspondence with the real quadratic irrationals. The correspondence is explicitly provided by Minkowski's question-mark function. That article also reviews tools that make it easy to work with such continued fractions. Consider first the purely periodic part

This can, in fact, be written as

with the  being integers, and satisfying  Explicit values can be obtained by writing 

which is termed a "shift", so that 

and similarly a reflection, given by

so that .  Both of these matrices are unimodular, arbitrary products remain unimodular. Then, given  as above, the corresponding matrix is of the form 

and one has

as the explicit form. As all of the matrix entries are integers, this matrix belongs to the modular group

Relation to quadratic irrationals

A quadratic irrational number is an irrational real root of the quadratic equation

where the coefficients a, b, and c are integers, and the discriminant, b2 − 4ac, is greater than zero. By the quadratic formula every quadratic irrational can be written in the form

where P, D, and Q are integers, D > 0 is not a perfect square (but not necessarily square-free), and Q divides the quantity P2 − D (for example (6+)/4). Such a quadratic irrational may also be written in another form with a square-root of a square-free number (for example (3+)/2) as explained for quadratic irrationals.

By considering the complete quotients of periodic continued fractions, Euler was able to prove that if x is a regular periodic continued fraction, then x is a quadratic irrational number. The proof is straightforward. From the fraction itself, one can construct the quadratic equation with integral coefficients that x must satisfy.

Lagrange proved the converse of Euler's theorem: if x is a quadratic irrational, then the regular continued fraction expansion of x is periodic. Given a quadratic irrational x one can construct m different quadratic equations, each with the same discriminant, that relate the successive complete quotients of the regular continued fraction expansion of x to one another. Since there are only finitely many of these equations (the coefficients are bounded), the complete quotients (and also the partial denominators) in the regular continued fraction that represents x must eventually repeat.

Reduced surds

The quadratic surd  is said to be reduced if  and its conjugate 
satisfies the inequalities . For instance, the golden ratio  is a reduced surd because it is greater than one and its conjugate  is greater than −1 and less than zero. On the other hand, the square root of two  is greater than one but is not a reduced surd because its conjugate  is less than −1.

Galois proved that the regular continued fraction which  represents a quadratic surd ζ is purely periodic if and only if ζ is a reduced surd. In fact, Galois showed more than this. He also proved that if ζ is a reduced quadratic surd and η is its conjugate, then the continued fractions for ζ and for (−1/η) are both purely periodic, and the repeating block in one of those continued fractions is the mirror image of the repeating block in the other. In symbols we have

where ζ is any reduced quadratic surd, and η is its conjugate.

From these two theorems of Galois a result already known to Lagrange can be deduced. If r > 1 is a rational number that is not a perfect square, then

In particular, if n is any non-square positive integer, the regular continued fraction expansion of  contains a repeating block of length m, in which the first m − 1 partial denominators form a palindromic string.

Length of the repeating block

By analyzing the sequence of combinations

that can possibly arise when ζ = (P + )/Q is expanded as a regular continued fraction, Lagrange showed that the largest partial denominator ai in the expansion is less than 2, and that the length of the repeating block is less than 2D.

More recently, sharper arguments  based on the divisor function have shown that L(D), the length of the repeating block for a quadratic surd of discriminant D, is given by

where the big O means "on the order of", or "asymptotically proportional to" (see big O notation).

Canonical form and repetend
The following iterative algorithm  can be used to obtain the continued fraction expansion in canonical form (S is any natural number that is not a perfect square):

Notice that mn, dn, and an are always integers.
The algorithm terminates when this triplet is the same as one encountered before.
The algorithm can also terminate on ai when ai = 2 a0, which is easier to implement.

The expansion will repeat from then on. The sequence [a0; a1, a2, a3, ...] is the continued fraction expansion:

Example
To obtain  as a continued fraction, begin with m0 = 0; d0 = 1; and a0 = 10 (102 = 100 and 112 = 121 > 114 so 10 chosen).

 

 

 

 

So, m1 = 10; d1 = 14; and a1 = 1.

 

Next, m2 = 4; d2 = 7; and a2 = 2.

 

 

 

 

 

Now, loop back to the second equation above.

Consequently, the simple continued fraction for the square root of 114 is

  

 is approximately 10.67707 82520. After one expansion of the repetend, the continued fraction yields the rational fraction  whose decimal value is approx. 10.67707 80856, a relative error of
0.0000016% or 1.6 parts in 100,000,000.

Generalized continued fraction
A more rapid method is to evaluate its generalized continued fraction. From the formula derived there:

and the fact that 114 is 2/3 of the way between 102=100 and 112=121 results in

which is simply the aforementioned [10;1,2, 10,2,1, 20,1,2] evaluated at every third term. Combining pairs of fractions produces

which is now  evaluated at the third term and every six terms thereafter.

See also

Notes

References

 (This is now available as a reprint from Dover Publications.)

Continued fractions
Mathematical analysis